Grega Žemlja claimed the singles title. He won against Bernard Tomic 7–6(4), 6–3 in the final.

Seeds

Draw

Finals

Top half

Bottom half

References
 Main draw
 Qualifying draw

Singles
2011